Miss Teen USA 1996, the 14th Miss Teen USA pageant, was televised live from Las Cruces, New Mexico on 21 August 1996.  At the conclusion of the final competition, Christie Lee Woods of Texas was crowned by outgoing queen Keylee Sue Sanders of Kansas.

The pageant was hosted by Bob Goen for the third and final year, with color commentary by Shari Belafonte and entertainment from The Monkees.  This was the only year that the pageant was held in Las Cruces, although Albuquerque had previously played host to the 1987 Miss USA pageant. For the first time ever, 6 out of 10 semifinalists were African-American.

Results

Placements

Special awards
Miss Congeniality: Lavinia Magruder (Vermont)
Miss Photogenic: Kelly Gaudet (Florida)
Style Award: Mandy Carraway (Kansas)
Best in Swimsuit: Leah Sexton (Missouri)

 Historical significance 
 Texas wins competition for the first time. Also becoming in the 13th state who wins Miss Teen USA.
 Pennsylvania earns the 1st runner-up position for the first time.
 California earns the 2nd runner-up position for the first time.
 Arizona finishes as Top 6  for the first time.
 Maryland finishes as Top 6  for the first time.
 Missouri finishes as Top 6 for the second time. The last time it was placed in 1994.
 States that placed in semifinals the previous year were California and Missouri.
 California and Missouri placed for the third consecutive year. 
 Pennsylvania last placed in 1994.
 New York last placed in 1993.
 Maryland and Oklahoma last placed in 1992.
 North Dakota and Texas last placed in 1991.
 Arizona last placed in 1990.
 Michigan placed for the first time.
 Florida and Kansas break an ongoing streak of placements since 1994.
 Tennessee breaks an ongoing streak of placements since 1993.

Scores

Preliminary competition
The following is the contestants average scores in the preliminary competition.

Final competition scores

Delegates
The Miss Teen USA 1996 delegates were:

 Alabama - Luann Roberts
 Alaska - Brandee McCoskey
 Arizona - Courtney Hamilton
 Arkansas - Aimee Delatte
 California - Michelle Cardamon
 Colorado - Ara Francis
 Connecticut - Marissa Perez
 Delaware - Ashley Anderson
 District of Columbia - Shannan McCray
 Florida - Kelly Gaudet
 Georgia - Summer Newmann
 Hawaii - Monica Ivey
 Idaho - Suzan Dandeneau
 Illinois - Eisa Istok
 Indiana - Misha Ivetich
 Iowa - Allison Dickey
 Kansas - Amanda Carraway
 Kentucky - Kelly Marie Sodan
 Louisiana - Kimi Fairchild
 Maine - Laura Larson
 Maryland - Jennifer Smith
 Massachusetts - Maria Menounos
 Michigan - Tamika Thomas
 Minnesota - Sarah Cahill
 Mississippi - Brandee Layne Loving
 Missouri - Leah Sexton
 Montana - Grace Murray Tubbs
 Nebraska - Mandy Groff
 Nevada - Cerina Vincent
 New Hampshire - Melissa Coish
 New Jersey - Jessica Ponzo
 New Mexico - Whitni Zimmerman
 New York -  Aiesha Hendrick
 North Carolina - Tammy Ashton
 North Dakota - Katrina Bergstrom
 Ohio - Tara Shaffer
 Oklahoma - Latoya Farley
 Oregon - Heather Noelle Jones
 Pennsylvania - Patricia Campbell
 Rhode Island - Kelly Dutra
 South Carolina - Wendy Christina Roberts
 South Dakota - Tatewin Means
 Tennessee - Adrienne Parker
 Texas - Christie Lee Woods Utah - Jodi Webb
 Vermont - Lavinia Magruder
 Virginia - Kandy Marshall
 Washington - Emily Ballard
 West Virginia - Heather Gray
 Wisconsin - Nicole Lynn Werra
 Wyoming''' - Michelle Marie Jefferson

Crossovers
Two contestants later competed in the Miss America pageant.  Kelly Gaudet (Florida) later became Miss Florida 2001 and Marissa Perez (Connecticut) held the Miss Connecticut title the same year.  Gaudet made the top ten in the pageant.
Two other contestants competed in the Miss USA pageant. Amanda Carraway (Kansas) became Miss Kansas USA 1999 and Sarah Cahill (Minnesota) was Miss Minnesota USA 2003.  Since 1990, this year had the smallest number of delegates who went on to win a Miss USA state title.
Christie Lee Woods later competed on the fifth season of the Emmy award-winning CBS reality show, The Amazing Race, with her boyfriend turned fiancé Colin Guinn, and finished in second place. They were deemed by the show's host to be one of the most competitive couples to ever compete.
Patricia Campbell (PA), won one of the episodes of NBC's reality show Fear Factor

Judges
Joyce Brothers
Karen Clark
Chris Cooper
Bobbie Eakes
Joseph Kendall
Bob Van Riper

References

External links
Official website

1996
1996 in the United States
1996 beauty pageants
1996 in New Mexico